Mitchell Adam Kaye (born December 13, 1957) is an American Republican Party politician in Georgia, United States. He was elected to the Georgia State House of Representatives to represent the 37th District of Georgia in 1992. He holds a B.A in economics and an M.B.A. in finance, both from the University of Florida 

In 2022, Kaye returned to the House of Representatives to succeed Matt Dollar, who resigned midway through his term. Kaye was officially sworn into office on May 17, 2022.

References

Living people
Republican Party members of the Georgia House of Representatives
University of Florida College of Liberal Arts and Sciences alumni
21st-century American politicians
Warrington College of Business alumni
1957 births